Beschloss is a surname. Notable people with the surname include: 

Afsaneh Mashayekhi Beschloss (born 1956), Iranian national treasurer and chief investment officer of the World Bank, wife of Michael
Michael Beschloss (born 1955), American historian